Kathryn Stott (born 10 December 1958) is an English classical pianist who performs as a concerto soloist, recitalist and chamber musician. Her specialities include the English and French classical repertoire, contemporary classical music and the tango. She is a professor at the Royal Northern College of Music, Manchester and has organised several music festivals and concert series.

Grove Music Online describes Stott's playing as "marked by a vivid sense of immediacy and personal communication." A review of her fiftieth birthday gala concert in The Times describes her as "one of the most versatile pianists on the circuit".

Early life and education
Stott was born in Nelson, Lancashire. Her mother was a piano teacher and she began to learn the piano at the age of five. She attended the Yehudi Menuhin School, where her teachers included Nadia Boulanger, Marcel Ciampi, Barbara Kerslake and Ravel specialist, Vlado Perlemuter, and then studied at the Royal College of Music with Kendall Taylor.

Performance and recording career
Stott's career as a soloist was launched after she gained fifth place in the Leeds International Piano Competition in 1978. Her London début was at the Purcell Room the same year. She has since toured throughout Europe, Asia, America and Australia with a concert repertoire that encompasses concertos, solo piano music and chamber music. She is unusual in always performing from a score.

Stott has a particular affinity with English music, and her series of recordings of works by Frank Bridge, George Lloyd, John Ireland and William Walton is described as "distinguished" in Grove. She is also known for her love of French music, particularly the works of Gabriel Fauré, whose complete piano works she has recorded to critical acclaim. Contemporary classical music is another of Stott's specialities. She has given the first performances of many works, including a concerto by Sir Peter Maxwell Davies, Michael Nyman's The Piano Concerto and Graham Fitkin's Circuit (with Noriko Ogawa). Since the mid-1990s, she has also been interested in tango and other Latin dance music, which she describes as "primitive music, hard to place, both abrasive and tender".

Stott first met her long-time collaborator, the noted American cellist Yo-Yo Ma, in 1978 when she "discovered a Chinese man playing the cello" in her flat after returning from holiday. (Ma had rented the flat from Stott's flat-mate, violinist Nigel Kennedy, without realising that it was shared). Stott and Ma have worked together since 1985; the pair frequently tours together and has made several joint recordings, including Soul of the Tango and Obrigado Brazil, which received Grammy Awards in 1999 and 2004. In 2020, Stott curated their album Songs of Comfort and Hope as a musical response to the impact of the pandemic. She also has long-standing collaborations with cellists Truls Mørk, Christian Poltéra and Natalie Clein, violinist Janine Jansen, and pianist Noriko Ogawa.

Artistic direction
Stott has directed several successful music festivals and concert series in the north of England. In 1995, she organised a Fauré festival in Manchester to mark the composer's 150th anniversary. According to the Independent, the event was "transformed by her enthusiasm and her own sumptuous performances of this neglected composer's works." The success of the festival led to her appointment as Chevalier dans l'Ordre des Arts et des Lettres by the French government.

She directed two major piano festivals at the Manchester Bridgewater Hall in 2000 and 2003. As Stott considers "It's very important at an event like this that we should let people play", both festivals featured multiple Steinway grands that the public were allowed to try, as well as a variety of novelty pianos including a red "Ferrari" Steinway, an "exploded" piano revealing the internal workings, a grove of woven pianos, and a concert grand fitted with a pool which played a variety of watery sounds.

In 1998, Stott directed a concert series "Out of the Shadows" with the Royal Liverpool Philharmonic, featuring two neglected female composers, Clara Schumann and Fanny Mendelssohn. More recently, she has directed the series "Chopin: The Music and the Legacy" at Leeds College of Music (2004–05) and "Paris" at the Sheffield Crucible (2006). In 2008, she was appointed the musical director of the Manchester Chamber Concerts Society. She is also on the board of the Hallé Orchestra. She will succeed Piers Lane as the artistic director of the Australian Festival of Chamber Music in 2018.

Teaching
As of 2008, Stott teaches at the Royal Academy of Music in London and at Chetham's School of Music in Manchester. She formerly taught at the Royal Northern College of Music in Manchester.
She joined the Piano Faculty of the Norwegian Academy of Music in Oslo from September 2016.

Personal life
In 2008, Stott lived in Hebden Bridge, West Yorkshire. As of 2016, she lives in Manchester. She has a daughter, Lucy, from a previous marriage.

Partial discography

References

External links
Kathryn Stott's official website

English classical pianists
English women pianists
Piano pedagogues
Academics of the Royal Academy of Music
Prize-winners of the Leeds International Pianoforte Competition
Grammy Award winners
Chevaliers of the Ordre des Arts et des Lettres
Alumni of the Royal College of Music
People educated at Yehudi Menuhin School
People from Nelson, Lancashire
1958 births
Living people
21st-century classical pianists
Women music educators
21st-century English women musicians
Women classical pianists
21st-century women pianists